XHENS-FM is a radio station on 88.9 FM in Navojoa, Sonora, Mexico. It is owned by Uniradio and is known as La Zeta.

History
XENS-AM 1480 received its concession on August 31, 1960. The 1,000-watt station was owned by Juana María Infante. XENS was owned by Mayo Radio from 1993 until its 2005 sale to Uniradio. By the 2000s, XENS was operating with 5 kW day and 250 watts at night.

XENS migrated to FM in 2011 as XHENS-FM 107.1. XHENS moved to 88.9 MHz on March 23, 2020, as a condition of the renewal of its concession, in order to clear 106-108 MHz as much as possible for community and indigenous stations.

References

Regional Mexican radio stations
Radio stations in Sonora
Radio stations established in 1960
Mass media in Navojoa
1960 establishments in Mexico